Rutracker.org (torrents.ru until 2010) is the biggest Russian BitTorrent tracker. As of March 2022, it had 13.74 million registered users, 2.141 million of torrents (1.975 million of them were active), and the total volume of all torrents was 4.653 Petabytes.

History
 September 18, 2004 – torrent tracker was created
 July 5, 2008 – all pornographic materials were moved to a separate torrent tracker called 
 February 18, 2010 – domain name was changed from torrents.ru to rutracker.org
 November 9, 2015 – tracker was banned by the Moscow City Court
 January 25, 2016 – Russian Internet providers banned the website as was requested in Court

References 

BitTorrent websites
File sharing communities